Thondernad  is a village in Wayanad district in the state of Kerala, India.

Demographics
 India census, Thondernad had a population of 11092 with 5642 males and 5450 females.

Villages 
 Mananthavady
 Vellamunda
 Nalloornad
Payyampally
Thavinjal
Vimalanager
Anjukunnu
Panamaram
Tharuvana
Kallody
Oorpally
Valat
Thrissilery

Transportation
Thondernad can be accessed from Mananthavady or Kalpetta. The Periya ghat road connects Mananthavady to Kannur and Thalassery.  The Thamarassery mountain road connects Calicut with Kalpetta. The Kuttiady mountain road connects Vatakara with Kalpetta and Mananthavady. The Palchuram mountain road connects Kannur and Iritty with Mananthavady.  The road from Nilambur to Ooty is also connected to Wayanad through the village of Meppadi.

The nearest railway station is at Vadakara, about 50km apart from korome. Kozhikkode, kannur, mysuru railway stations are at a distance of 80km,84km and 128km respectively.Nearest airports are Kozhikode International Airport-120 km, Bengaluru International Airport-290 km, and   Kannur International Airport, 58 km.

References

Villages in Wayanad district
Mananthavady Area